The Center on International Cooperation (CIC) is a foreign policy think tank based at New York University that works to enhance multilateral responses to global problems, including conflict, humanitarian crises, and recovery; international security challenges, including weapons proliferation and the changing balance of power; resource scarcity and climate change. It was founded in 1996 by Dr. Shepard Forman.

History and staff 
CIC was established in 1996 by Dr. Shepard Forman, former director of the Ford Foundation's Human Rights, Governance and Public Policy, and International Affairs programs. Forman has a Ph.D. in Anthropology and conducted post-doctoral work in development economics at the Institute for Development Studies at Sussex, England. He taught at Indiana University, the University of Michigan, and the University of Chicago. He authored two books on Brazil and edited six others on multilateral themes and a number of policy papers, including recommendations that served as forerunners to the UN Peacebuilding Commission.

In 2005, Dr. Bruce D. Jones became CIC's Director. Jones has held a range of positions at the United Nations, and works regularly with the Brookings Institution and the World Bank. Most recently, Jones served as Senior External Advisor to the World Bank's 2011 World Development Report on Conflict, Security, and Development, and in March 2010 was appointed by the United Nations Secretary-General as a member of the Senior Advisory Group to guide the Review of International Civilian Capacities. Other notable fellows include Dr. Barnett Rubin, Jean Arnault, and Jean-Marie Guéhenno.

Under Jones, and with Richard Gowan and Jake Sherman, CIC's Annual Review of Global Peace Operations and Review of Political Missions have become seminal works on global peace operations. With Rahul Chandran and other CIC staff, Jones has also produced policy reports that have substantially informed the design of a number of national and multilateral programs and initiatives, including the UN Department of Peacekeeping Operations project, New Horizons for Peacekeeping; the OECD and UK Department for International Development's work on state fragility and resilience; the OECD's workstream on financing; and the United Nations Review of International Civilian Capacities initiative, among others.

CIC staff have enjoyed great influence, both through secondments and research support, in a number of high-profile United Nations and multilateral initiatives. The first of these, the 2004 UN High-Level Panel on Threats, Challenges and Change, strongly featured CIC staff recommendations on peacebuilding, development, and organized crime, all of which have come to be prominently placed in the UN's reform agenda. CIC also helped draft the IAEA's report on WMD terrorism in April 2010, drawing from previous research support to the IAEA Special Event on the Nuclear Fuel Cycle. Most recently, CIC was asked to provide policy and research support to the Secretary-General's High-level Panel on Global Sustainability, with the Panel's findings expected to be released by the end of 2011.

In 2015, Sarah Cliffe, a former senior officer at the World Bank and the United Nations became CIC's third Director.

CIC staff regularly collaborate with a number of international and domestic institutions, such as the Brookings Institution, the European Council on Foreign Relations, the Netherlands Institute for Multiparty Democracy (NIMD), the International Institute for Democracy and Electoral Assistance (IDEA), the Stanford University Center for International Security and Cooperation (CISAC), and Humanitarian Outcomes. CIC maintains strong links to the current U.S. Administration, strengthened through CIC's institutional and programmatic foci on issues of interest to the U.S. Government and to capitals around the world.

The Center receives and has received financial support and funding from a number of institutions such as The Ford Foundation, the Carnegie Corporation of New York, the Open Society Foundations, the United Nations Assistance Mission in Afghanistan, the United States Institute of Peace, the World Bank, the Brookings Institution, the Compton Foundation, and the Asia-Pacific Centre for the Responsibility to Protect.

Leadership 
 Sarah F. Cliffe, Director of New York University's CIC
 Paige Arthur, Deputy director of New York University's CIC
 Hanny Megally, Senior Fellow at New York University's CIC
 Barnett Rubin, Senior Fellow and Associate Director of CIC, where he directs the Afghanistan Pakistan Regional Program (2000)
 Jason Stearns, CIC Senior Fellow and Director of the Congo Research Group (2001)
 David Steven, Senior Fellow and Associate Director at New York University's CIC

Programs 

CIC's programs and research activities focus on international security institutions, post-conflict peacebuilding, and global peace operations, with particular emphasis on the UN and multilateral responses to conflict.

References

External links 
 
 International Cooperation in Relation to Bird Migration

 
Nonpartisan organizations in the United States
Political and economic think tanks in the United States
Foreign policy and strategy think tanks in the United States